The Bugei jūhappan (武芸十八般 "Eighteen Kinds Of Martial Arts") is a selection of combat techniques and martial arts used by the samurai of Tokugawa-era Japan.  Established by Hirayama Gyozo, the concept is based on earlier Chinese traditions, such as Eighteen Arms of Wushu.

Eighteen arts 
The Eighteen Arts consist of a mixture of native Japanese and imported Chinese martial art techniques and tactics. Within each art, various Ryū developed, with different methods of performing that particular art. Certain Ryū, in turn, influenced the martial arts that were included in the list,  Asayama Ichiden-ryū, Kukishin-ryū, Shinden-Fudo-ryū and Tagaki Yoshin-ryū. The exact list varies, but is commonly held to include:
 Kyūjutsu, archery.
 Sōjutsu, fighting with a yari (spear).
 Kenjutsu, fencing.
 Iaijutsu, sword-drawing.
 Tantōjutsu, knife-fighting.
 Juttejutsu, fighting with a jutte (truncheon).
 Shurikenjutsu, throwing shuriken.
 Naginatajutsu, fighting with a polearm, usually a naginata.
 Hōjutsu, shooting (with firearms).
 Bōjutsu, fighting with a bō (staff).
 Kusarigamajutsu, fighting with a chain-and-sickle.
 Hojōjutsu, tying up an opponent.
 Bajutsu, horseriding.
 Suieijutsu, swimming in armour.
 Ninjutsu, espionage.

Other arts that were often included in the list are:

 Chikujōjutsu, fortifying a castle against siege.
 Yawara, wrestling.
 Fukumibarijutsu, needle-spitting.
 Yabusame, mounted archery.
 Mōjirijutsu, fighting with a barbed staff.
 Yadomejutsu, deflecting flying arrows.
 Saiminjutsu, hypnotism.
 Jūjutsu, grappling and fighting unarmed.

References

Ko-ryū bujutsu